Gilles Marie Joseph Albrier (4 October 1791 – March 1863) was a French painter. He was a student of Jean-Baptiste Regnault. He exhibited at the Salon in 1819, 1822, 1824, 1827 and 1836.

Gallery

References

External links

1791 births
1863 deaths
19th-century French painters
French male painters
19th-century French male artists